Stalemate is a situation in chess where the player whose turn it is to move is not in check and has no legal move. Stalemate results in a draw. During the endgame, stalemate is a resource that can enable the player with the inferior position to draw the game rather than lose. In more complex positions, stalemate is much rarer, usually taking the form of a swindle that succeeds only if the superior side is inattentive. Stalemate is also a common theme in endgame studies and other chess problems.

The outcome of a stalemate was standardized as a draw in the 19th century. Before this standardization, its treatment varied widely, including being deemed a win for the stalemating player, a half-win for that player, or a loss for that player; not being permitted; and resulting in the stalemated player missing a turn. Stalemate rules vary in other games of the chess family.

Etymology and usage
The first recorded use of stalemate is from 1765. It is a compounding of Middle English stale and mate (meaning checkmate). Stale is probably derived from Anglo-French estale meaning "standstill", a cognate of "stand" and "stall", both ultimately derived from the Proto-Indo-European root *sta-. The first recorded use in a figurative sense is in 1885.

Stalemate has become a widely used metaphor for other situations where there is a conflict or contest between two parties, such as war or political negotiations, and neither side is able to achieve victory, resulting in what is also called an impasse, a deadlock, or a Mexican standoff. Chess writers note that this usage is a misnomer because, unlike in chess, the situation is often a temporary one that is ultimately resolved, even if it seems currently intractable.
The term "stalemate" is sometimes used incorrectly as a generic term for a draw in chess. While draws are common, they are rarely the direct result of stalemate.

Examples

With Black to move, Black is stalemated in diagrams 1 to 4. Stalemate is an important factor in the endgame – the endgame setup in diagram 1, for example, quite frequently is relevant in play (see King and pawn versus king endgame). The position in diagram 1 occurred in an 1898 game between Amos Burn and Harry Pillsbury and also in a 1925 game between Savielly Tartakower and Richard Réti. The same position, except shifted to the e-, occurred in a 2009 game between Gata Kamsky and Vladimir Kramnik.

The position in diagram 3 is an example of a pawn drawing against a queen. Stalemates of this sort can often save a player from losing an apparently hopeless position (see Queen versus pawn endgame).

Examples from games

Anand versus Kramnik

In this position from the game Viswanathan Anand–Vladimir Kramnik from the 2007 World Chess Championship, Black played 65...Kxf5, stalemating White. (Any other move by Black loses.)

Korchnoi versus Karpov

An intentional stalemate occurred on the 124th move of the fifth game of the 1978 World Championship match between Viktor Korchnoi and Anatoly Karpov. The game had been a theoretical draw for many moves. White's bishop is useless; it cannot defend the queening square at a8 nor attack the black pawn on the light a4-square. If the white king heads towards the black pawn, the black king can move towards a8 and set up a fortress.

The players were not on speaking terms, however, so neither would offer a draw by agreement. On his 124th move, White played 124.Bg7, delivering stalemate. Korchnoi said that it gave him pleasure to stalemate Karpov and that it was slightly humiliating. Until 2021, this was the longest game played in a World Chess Championship final match, as well as the only World Championship game to end in stalemate before 2007.

Bernstein versus Smyslov

Sometimes, a surprise stalemate saves a game. In the game Ossip Bernstein–Vasily Smyslov (first diagram), Black can win by sacrificing the f-pawn and using the king to support the b-pawn. However, Smyslov thought it was good to advance the b-pawn because he could win the white rook with a skewer if it captured the pawn. Play went:

1... b2 2. Rxb2
Now 2...Rh2+ 3.Kf3! Rxb2 is stalemate (second diagram). Smyslov played 2...Kg4, and the game was drawn after 3.Kf1 (see Rook and pawn versus rook endgame).

Matulović versus Minev

Whereas the possibility of stalemate arose in the Bernstein–Smyslov game because of a blunder, it can also arise without one, as in the game Milan Matulović–Nikolay Minev (first diagram). Play continued:

1. Rc6 Kg5 2. Kh3 Kh5 3. f4
The only meaningful attempt to make progress. Now all moves by Black (like 3...Ra3+) lose, with one exception.

3... Rxa6!
Now 4.Rxa6 would be stalemate. White played 4.Rc5+ instead, and the game was drawn several moves later.

Williams versus Harrwitz

In the game Elijah Williams–Daniel Harrwitz (first diagram), Black was up a knight and a pawn in an endgame. This would normally be a decisive  advantage, but Black could find no way to make progress because of various stalemate resources available to White. The game continued:

72... Ra8 73. Rc1
Avoiding the threatened 73...Nc2+.

73... Ke3 74. Rc4 Ra4 75. Rc1 Kd2 76. Rc4 Kd3
76...Nc2+ 77.Rxc2+! Kxc2 is stalemate.

77. Rc3+! Kd4
77...Kxc3 is stalemate.

78. Rc1 Ra3 79. Rd1+ Kc5
79...Rd3 80.Rxd3+! leaves Black with either insufficient material to win after 80...Nxd3 81.Kxa2 or a standard fortress in a corner draw after 80...Kxd3.

80. Rc1+ Kb5 81. Rc7 Nd5 82. Rc2 Nc3?? 83. Rb2+ Kc4 84. Rb3! (see second diagram)
Now the players agreed to a draw, since 84...Kxb3 or 84...Rxb3 is stalemate, as is 84...Ra8 85.Rxc3+! Kxc3.

Black could still have won the game until his critical mistake on move 82. Instead of 82...Nc3, 82...Nb4 wins; for example, after 83.Rc8 Re3 84.Rb8+ Kc5 85.Rc8+ Kd5 86.Rd8+ Kc6 87.Ra8 Re1+ 88.Kb2 Kc5 89.Kc3 a1=Q+, Black wins.

Carlsen versus Van Wely

This 2007 game, Magnus Carlsen–Loek van Wely, ended in stalemate. White used the second-rank defense in a rook and bishop versus rook endgame for 46 moves. The fifty-move rule was about to come into effect, under which White could claim a draw. The game ended:

109. Rd2+ Bxd2 
White was stalemated.

More complex examples

Although stalemate usually occurs in the endgame, it can also occur with more pieces on the board. Outside of relatively simple endgame positions, such as those above, stalemate occurs rarely, usually when the side with the superior position has overlooked the possibility of stalemate. This is typically realized by the inferior side's sacrifice of one or more pieces in order to force stalemate. A piece that is offered as a sacrifice to bring about stalemate is sometimes called a desperado.

Evans versus Reshevsky

One of the best-known examples of the desperado is the game Larry Evans–Samuel Reshevsky that was dubbed "The Swindle of the Century". Evans sacrificed his queen on move 49 and offered his rook on move 50. White's rook has been called the eternal rook. Capturing it results in stalemate, but otherwise it stays on the seventh  and checks Black's king ad infinitum (i.e. perpetual check). The game would inevitably end in a draw by agreement, by threefold repetition, or by an eventual claim under the fifty-move rule.

47. h4! Re2+ 48. Kh1 Qxg3??
After 48...Qg6! 49.Rf8 Qe6! 50.Rh8+ Kg6, Black remains a piece ahead after 51.Qxe6 Nxe6, or  after 51.gxf4 Re1+ and 52...Qa2+.

49. Qg8+! Kxg8 50. Rxg7+!

Gelfand versus Kramnik

The position at right occurred in Boris Gelfand–Vladimir Kramnik, 1994 FIDE Candidates match, game 6, in Sanghi Nagar, India. Kramnik, down two pawns and on the defensive, would be very happy with a draw. Gelfand has just played 67. Re4–e7 (first diagram), a strong-looking move that threatens 68.Qxf6, winning a third pawn, or 68.Rc7, further constricting Black. Black responded 67... Qc1 If White takes Black's undefended rook with 68.Qxd8, Black's desperado queen forces the draw with 68...Qh1+ 69.Kg3 Qh2+!, compelling 70.Kxh2 stalemate (second diagram). If White avoids the stalemate with 68.Rxg7+ Kxg7 69.Qxd8, Black draws by perpetual check with 69...Qh1+ 70.Kg3 Qg1+ 71.Kf4 Qc1+! 72.Ke4 Qc6+! 73.Kd3 (73.d5 Qc4+; 73.Qd5 Qc2+) Qxf3+! 74.Kd2 Qg2+! 75.Kc3 Qc6+ 76.Kb4 Qb5+ 77.Ka3 Qd3+. Gelfand played 68. d5 instead but still only drew.

Troitsky versus Vogt

In Troitsky–, 1896, the famous endgame study composer Alexey Troitsky pulled off an elegant swindle in actual play. After Troitsky's 1. Rd1!, Black fell into the trap with the seemingly crushing 1... Bh3?, threatening 2...Qg2#. The game concluded 2. Rxd8+ Kxd8 3. Qd1+! Qxd1 stalemate. White's bishop, knight, and f-pawn are all pinned and unable to move.

In studies

Stalemate is a frequent theme in endgame studies and other chess compositions. An example is the "White to Play and Draw" study at right, composed by the American master Frederick Rhine and published in 2006. White saves a draw with 1. Ne5+! Black wins after 1.Nb4+? Kb5! or 1.Qe8+? Bxe8 2.Ne5+ Kb5! 3.Rxb2+ Nb3. 1... Bxe5 After 1...Kb5? 2.Rxb2+ Nb3 3.Rxc4! Qxe3 (best; 3...Qb8+ 4.Kd7 Qxh8 5.Rxb3+ forces checkmate) 4.Rxb3+! Qxb3 5.Qh1! Bf5+ 6.Kd8!, White is winning. 2. Qe8+! 2.Qxe5? Qb7+ 3.Kd8 Qd7#. 2... Bxe8 3. Rh6+ Bd6 3...Kb5 4.Rxb6+ Kxb6 5.Nxc4+ also leads to a drawn endgame. Not 5.Rxb2+? Bxb2 6.Nc4+ Kb5 7.Nxb2 Bh5! trapping White's knight. 4. Rxd6+! Kxd6 5. Nxc4+! Nxc4 6. Rxb6+ Nxb6+ Moving the king is actually a better try, but the resulting endgame of two knights and a bishop against a rook is a well-established theoretical draw. 7. Kd8! (rightmost diagram) Black is three pieces ahead, but if White is allowed to take the bishop, the two knights are insufficient to force checkmate. The only way to save the bishop is to move it, resulting in stalemate. A similar idea occasionally enables the inferior side to save a draw in the ending of bishop, knight, and king versus lone king.

At right is a composition by A. J. Roycroft which was published in the British Chess Magazine in 1957. White draws with 1. c7! after which there are two main lines:
1... f5 2. c8=Q (if 2.c8=R? then 2...Bc3 3.Rxc3 Qg7#) 2... Bc3 3. Qxf5+ draws by stalemate.
1... g5 (1...Ka1 2.c8=R transposes) 2. c8=R (2.c8=Q? Ka1 3.Qc2 [or 3.Qc1+] b1=Q+ wins) 2... Ka1 (2...Ng6 3.Rc1+ forces Black to capture, stalemating White) 3. Rc2!! (not 3.Rc1+?? b1=Q+! 4.Rxb1+ Bxb1#; now White threatens 4.Rxb2 and 5.Rxa2+, forcing stalemate or perpetual check) 3... Bc4 (trying to get in a check; 3...b1=Q, 3...b1=B, and 3...Bb1 are all stalemate; 3...Ng6 4.Rc1+!) 4. Rc1+ Ka2 5. Ra1+ Kb3 6. Ra3+ Kc2 7. Rc3+ Kd2 8. Rc2+ (rightmost diagram). As in Evans–Reshevsky, Black cannot escape the "eternal rook".

In problems

Some chess problems require "White to move and stalemate Black in n moves" (rather than the more common "White to move and checkmate Black in n moves"). Problemists have also tried to construct the shortest possible game ending in stalemate. Sam Loyd devised one just ten moves long: 1.e3 a5 2.Qh5 Ra6 3.Qxa5 h5 4.Qxc7 Rah6 5.h4 f6 6.Qxd7+ Kf7 7.Qxb7 Qd3 8.Qxb8 Qh7 9.Qxc8 Kg6 10.Qe6 (first diagram). A similar stalemate is reached after: 1.d4 c5 2.dxc5 f6 3.Qxd7+ Kf7 4.Qxd8 Bf5 5.Qxb8 h5 6.Qxa8 Rh6 7.Qxb7 a6 8.Qxa6 Bh7 9.h4 Kg6 10.Qe6 (Frederick Rhine).

Loyd also demonstrated that stalemate can occur with all the pieces on the board: 1.d4 d6 2.Qd2 e5 3.a4 e4 4.Qf4 f5 5.h3 Be7 6.Qh2 Be6 7.Ra3 c5 8.Rg3 Qa5+ 9.Nd2 Bh4 10.f3 Bb3 11.d5 e3 12.c4 f4 (second diagram). Games such as this are occasionally played in tournaments as a pre-arranged draw.

Double stalemate

There are chess compositions featuring double stalemate. At left and at right are double stalemate positions, in which neither side has a legal move.  Double stalemate is theoretically possible in a practical game, though is not known to ever have happened. Consider the following position:

The game draws after a  like 1.Rg2 (1...b2+ 2.Rxb2; 1...c2 2.Rg4!). However, White has 1.Rb2?, an interesting blunder: if Black errs by 1...cxb2+? then White draws by 2.Kb1, creating a double stalemate position. Black could win by 1...c2! putting White in zugzwang.

The fastest known game ending in a double stalemate position was discovered by Enzo Minerva and published in the Italian newspaper l'Unità on 14 August 2007: 1.c4 d5 2.Qb3 Bh3 3.gxh3 f5 4.Qxb7 Kf7 5.Qxa7 Kg6 6.f3 c5 7.Qxe7 Rxa2 8.Kf2 Rxb2 9.Qxg7+ Kh5 10.Qxg8 Rxb1 11.Rxb1 Kh4 12.Qxh8 h5 13.Qh6 Bxh6 14.Rxb8 Be3+ 15.dxe3 Qxb8 16.Kg2 Qf4 17.exf4 d4 18.Be3 dxe3.

History of the stalemate rule
The stalemate rule has had a convoluted history. Although stalemate is universally recognized as a draw today, that has not been the case for much of the game's history. In the forerunners to modern chess, such as chaturanga, delivering stalemate resulted in a loss. This was changed in shatranj, however, where stalemating was a win. This practice persisted in chess as played in early 15th-century Spain. Lucena (c. 1497), however, treated stalemate as an inferior form of victory; it won only half the stake in games played for money, and this continued to be the case in Spain as late as 1600. From about 1600 to 1800, the rule in England was that stalemate was a loss for the player administering it, a rule that the eminent chess historian H. J. R. Murray believes may have been adopted from Russian chess. That rule disappeared in England before 1820, being replaced by the French and Italian rule that a stalemate was a drawn game.

Throughout history, a stalemate has at various times been:
A win for the stalemating player in 10th century Arabia and parts of medieval Europe.
A half-win for the stalemating player. In a game played for stakes, they would win half the stake (18th century Spain).
A win for the stalemated player in 9th century India, 17th century Russia, on the Central Plain of Europe in the 17th century, and 17th–18th century England. This rule continued to be published in Hoyle's Games Improved as late as 1866.
Illegal. If White made a move that would stalemate Black, he had to retract it and make a different move (Eastern Asia until the early 20th century). Murray likewise wrote that in Hindustani chess and Parsi chess, two of the three principal forms of chess played in India as of 1913, a player was not allowed to play a move that would stalemate the opponent. The same was true of Burmese chess, another chess variant, at the time of writing. Stalemate was not permitted in most of the Eastern Asiatic forms of the game (specifically in Burma, India, Japan, and Siam) until early in the 20th century.
The forfeiture of the stalemated player's turn to move (medieval France), although other medieval French sources treat stalemate as a draw.
A draw. This was the rule in 13th-century Italy and also stated in the German Cracow Poem (1422), that noted, however, that some players treated stalemate as equivalent to checkmate. This rule was ultimately adopted throughout Europe, but not in England until the 19th century, after being introduced there by Jacob Sarratt.

Proposed rule change
Periodically, writers have argued that stalemate should again be made a win for the side causing the stalemate. Grandmaster Larry Kaufman writes, "In my view, calling stalemate a draw is totally illogical, since it represents the ultimate zugzwang, where any move would get your king taken". The British master T. H. Tylor argued in a 1940 article in the British Chess Magazine that the present rule, treating stalemate as a draw, "is without historical foundation and irrational, and primarily responsible for a vast percentage of draws, and hence should be abolished". Years later, Fred Reinfeld wrote, "When Tylor wrote his attack on the stalemate rule, he released about his unhappy head a swarm of peevish maledictions that are still buzzing." Larry Evans calls the proposal to make stalemate a win for the stalemating player a "crude proposal that ... would radically alter centuries of tradition and make chess boring".

Rules in other chess variants
Not all variants of chess consider the stalemate to be a draw. Many regional variants, as well some variants of Western chess, have adopted their own rules on how to treat the stalemated player. In chaturanga, which is widely considered to be the common ancestor of all variants of chess, a stalemate was a win for the stalemated player. Around the 7th century, this game was adopted in the Middle East as shatranj with very similar rules to its predecessor; however, the stalemate rule was changed to its exact opposite: i.e. it was a win for the player delivering the stalemate. This game was in turn introduced to the Western world, where it would eventually evolve to modern-day Western chess, although the stalemate rule for Western chess was not standardized as a draw until the 19th century (see history of the rule).

Modern Asian variants
Chaturanga also evolved into several other games in various regions of Asia, all of which have varying rules on stalemating:
 In makruk (Thai chess), a stalemate results in a draw, like in Western chess.
 In shogi (Japanese chess) and the majority of its variants, a stalemate is a win for the player delivering the stalemate. However, in shogi (and in any variant of the game that features drops), stalemates are extremely rare due to the fact that no piece ever goes entirely out of play.
 In xiangqi (Chinese chess) it results in an immediate loss for the stalemated player (like in chaturanga and shogi), and there is no explicit distinction between it and checkmate. 
 In janggi (Korean chess), despite being very similar to xiangqi in terms of both the board and the pieces, allows the stalemated player to pass their turn; i.e., the player may (and in fact must) leave the general (analogous to the chess king) in position and make no move when stalemated.
 In sittuyin (Myanma/Burmese chess), stalemates are avoided altogether, as delivering them is illegal. Players are not allowed to leave the opponent with no legal moves without putting the king into check.

Western chess variants
The majority of variants of Western chess do not specify any alterations to the rule of stalemate. There are some variants, however, where the rule is specified to differ from that of standard chess:
 In losing chess, the stalemate rule varies depending on the version being played. According to the "international" rules, a stalemate is simply a win for the stalemated player. The Free Internet Chess Server, however, grants a win to the player with fewer pieces remaining on the board (regardless of who delivered the stalemate); if both players have the same number of pieces it is a draw. There is also a "joint" FICS/international rule, according to which a stalemate is only a win if both sources agree that it is a win (i.e. it counts as a win for the stalemated player if that player also happens to have fewer pieces remaining); in all other cases it is a draw.
 In Gliński's hexagonal chess, stalemate is neither a draw nor a full win. Instead, in tournament games, the player who delivers the stalemate earns ¾ point, while the stalemated player receives ¼ point.

See also
Checkmate
Desperado
Draw (chess)
Glossary of chess
Rules of chess
Swindle (chess)

Notes

References

External links

Edward Winter, Stalemate
"Chess: Stalemate by Self-Blockade" by Edward Winter
Edward Winter, 5929. Stalemate
"Stalemate!" Game Collection at chessgames.com
Spassky vs. Keres, 1961, ended in stalemate
A Defensive Brilliancy
Example of "stalemate" in politics

Chess terminology
Rules of chess